Dizygostemon is a genus of flowering plants belonging to the family Plantaginaceae.

Its native range is Northeastern Brazil.

Species:

Dizygostemon angustifolius 
Dizygostemon floribundus 
Dizygostemon riparius

References

Plantaginaceae
Plantaginaceae genera